Castle Peak Bay Immigration Centre (CIC,  is an immigration detention centre located in Tuen Mun, Hong Kong. 7,942 persons were held at CIC in 2015 who were slated for expulsion from Hong Kong.

Notable events 

In December 2019, an Indonesian migrant worker, author, and reporter Yuli Riswati, reported that she was strip-searched by a male doctor at CIC. She noted that "Many friends who are still detained there at CIC are suffering – the conditions are inhumane and unjust."

From 29 June 2020, a group of around 25 detainees reportedly went on hunger strike against what they saw as their indefinite detention, though authorities said that, while they were refusing official meals, tests including for glucose levels showed that they were in fact taking nutrition of some kind.

References

Tuen Mun District
Detention centers
Buildings and structures in Hong Kong